Isdell may refer to:

People
 E. Neville Isdell (born 1943), Irish businessman
 Wendy Isdell (born 1975), American author

Places
 Isdell River, Kimberley, Western Australia